Thomas Inwen (died 1743), of St. Saviour's, Southwark was a British brewer and politician who sat in the House of Commons from 1730 to 1743.
 
Inwen was a Southwark brewer. He married Sarah Hucks, daughter of William Hucks brewer of St. Giles's-in-the-Fields.

Inwen was returned as  Member of Parliament for Southwark at a by-election on 23 January 1730 and was returned again at the 1734 British general election. He voted against the Administration in all recorded divisions. On 10 March 1732 he supported a bill to stop hops being imported from America into Ireland. He was re-elected at the  1741 British general election. He did not vote in the election of the chairman of the elections committee in December 1741 and the division on the Hanoverians in December 1742.

Inwen died on 19 April 1743, leaving his property in trust to his only daughter, Sarah, who  married Henry Howard, 10th Earl of Suffolk.

References

1743 deaths
Members of the Parliament of Great Britain for English constituencies
British MPs 1727–1734
British MPs 1734–1741
British MPs 1741–1747
Year of birth missing